Hurt is a 2003 independent Canadian film written and directed by Steve DiMarco.

Plot
One night at a party, three teenagers start a friendship that becomes the most important of their lives. As they grow closer to each other, we begin to see the root of each of their hurts. Stevie's father refuses to deal with the suicide of Stevie's mother and ignores Stevie's need to deal with it. Darla is forced to deal with surviving on her own after her mother abandons them and her sister commits suicide. Boy's heroin addicted father tries to force Boy into procuring his drugs at any cost. These ever-escalating problems push Stevie, Darla and Boy into a darker corner than they've ever been. They decide to fight their way out together.

Cast
 Terra Vnesa as Stevie
 Andrew Martin-Smith as  Boy
 Stephanie Nikolaidis as  Darla
 Sabrina Grdevich as  Boy's Mother
 Alex Poch-Goldin as  Boy's Father
 John Ralston as Stevie's Father
 Ron Lea as  Darla's Father
 Stavroula Logothettis as Courtenay's Mother

External links
 

2003 films
English-language Canadian films
2003 drama films
Canadian independent films
Canadian drama films
2000s English-language films
2000s Canadian films